The Akira Kurosawa Memorial Short Film Competition is a major international short film awards ceremony, run by the Akira Kurosawa Foundation.  Since the inaugural 2004-2005 competition, the Grand Prix and numerous other prizes have been awarded on an annual basis.

2007 

The Akira Kurosawa Memorial Short Film Competition 2007 Final Round and Award Ceremony was held in Yurakucho, Tokyo on Sunday, January 13, 2008.

2006 

The Akira Kurosawa Memorial Short Film Competition 2006 Final Round and Award Ceremony was held in Yurakucho, Tokyo on Friday 17 November 2006.

2004-2005 

The Akira Kurosawa Memorial Short Film Competition 2004-2005 Final Round and Award Ceremony was held in the Asahi Hall (Yurakucho Marion Build. 12F) on 4 September 2005.

References 

Short Film Competition
Japanese film awards
Short film awards